PixL is an independent American television channel that broadcasts commercial-free films and miniseries targeted at families. The network debuted on December 7, 2010 on the Dish Network satellite system. Sky Angel added the channel on June 27, 2011.

References

External links
 PixL HD

Television channels and stations established in 2010
Commercial-free television networks
Movie channels
Television networks in the United States
Christian television networks